Maureen Rever (born 21 July 1938) is a Canadian sprinter. She competed in the women's 100 metres at the 1956 Summer Olympics. She finished third in the 1958 British Empire and Commonwealth Games 4×110 yards relay (with Diane Matheson, Eleanor Haslam, and Freyda Berman) and third in the 1959 Pan American Games 4×100 metres relay (with Sally McCallum, Valerie Jerome, and Heather Campbell). In the 1958 British Empire and Commonwealth Games Rever was eliminated in the semi-finals of the 220 yards and in the heats of the 100 yards. She also finished fourth in the 1959 Pan American Games long jump. She attended Luther College high school in Regina, Saskatchewan.

References

1938 births
Living people
Athletes (track and field) at the 1956 Summer Olympics
Athletes (track and field) at the 1958 British Empire and Commonwealth Games
Athletes (track and field) at the 1959 Pan American Games
Canadian female sprinters
Canadian female long jumpers
Olympic track and field athletes of Canada
Commonwealth Games bronze medallists for Canada
Commonwealth Games medallists in athletics
Pan American Games bronze medalists for Canada
Pan American Games medalists in athletics (track and field)
Athletes from Regina, Saskatchewan
Medalists at the 1959 Pan American Games
Medallists at the 1958 British Empire and Commonwealth Games